1921 in sports describes the year's events in world sport.

American football
 NFL championship – Chicago Staleys (later renamed the Chicago Bears; 9–1–1) 
 Rose Bowl (1920 season):
 The California Golden Bears won 21–0 over the Ohio State Buckeyes to win the college football national championship
 Cornell Big Red – college football national championship
 8 October — the first radio broadcast of a college game takes place between West Virginia and Pittsburgh

Association football
Brazil
Cruzeiro of Belo Horizonte, officially founded on January 2.
England
 The Football League – Burnley 59 points, Manchester City 54, Bolton Wanderers 52, Liverpool 51, Newcastle United 50, Tottenham Hotspur 47
 FA Cup final – Tottenham Hotspur 1–0 Wolverhampton Wanderers at Stamford Bridge, London
 The Football League is expanded by the conversion of the Third Division (founded in 1920) into the Third Division South (D3S: 22 clubs) and the creation of the Third Division North (D3N: 20 clubs).  This brings the total number of League clubs to 86. Existing league clubs in D3N are Stockport County (relegated from the Second Division) and Grimsby Town (transferred from the former Third Division). New league members in D3N are: Accrington Stanley (1921–1961), Ashington (1921–1929), Barrow (1921–1972), Chesterfield, Crewe Alexandra, Darlington, Durham City (1921–1928), Halifax Town, Hartlepool United, Lincoln City, Nelson (1921–1931), Rochdale, Southport (1921–1978), Stalybridge Celtic (1921–1923), Tranmere Rovers, Walsall, Wigan Borough (1921–1931) and Wrexham.
 Apart from Grimsby Town (now in D3N) and Crystal Palace (promoted to the Second Division), all the remaining members of the former Third Division are transferred to D3S.  Two new clubs are elected to this division: Aberdare Athletic (1921–1927) and Charlton Athletic.
Germany
 National Championship – FC Nuremberg 5–0 Berliner FC Vorwärts 1890 at Düsseldorf 
Republic of Ireland
 Formation of the Football Association of Ireland (FAI). It applies solely to the Republic of Ireland and is not to be confused with the Irish Football Association (IFA), which is now the organising body for football in Northern Ireland only. The split in Irish football governance is not reflected in other sports such as cricket and rugby union, in which Cricket Ireland and the Irish Rugby Football Union administer both countries.

Athletics
Men's 100 metres
 Charlie Paddock (USA) breaks the world record by running a time of 10.4 at Redlands, California.
Lithuania
  Officially established Lithuanian Athletics Championships.
Monaco
 first Women's Olympiad in Monte Carlo

Australian rules football
 30 June – North Melbourne disbands in an attempt to merge with VFL club Essendon and is disqualified from the rest of the VFA season; the merger is precluded by a veto by the government of Essendon moving to Arden Street.
VFL Premiership
 Richmond wins the 25th VFL Premiership, defeating Carlton 5.6 (36) to 4.8 (32) in the Grand Final
South Australian Football League
 7 May – Glenelg become the SAFL's eighth club when they play their first match against West Adelaide, losing 6.5 (41) to 18.10 (118).
 8 October – Port Adelaide 4.8 (32) defeat Norwood 3.6 (24) for their ninth SAFL premiership.
 Magarey Medal won by Dan Moriarty (South Adelaide), Charlie Adams (Port Adelaide), John Karney (West Torrens) and Walter Scott (Norwood)
West Australian Football League
 1 October – East Perth 5.9 (39) defeats East Fremantle 4.8 (32) to win its third consecutive premiership.
 The inaugural Sandover Medal is won by Tom Outridge, Sr. (Subiaco), and posthumously awarded retrospectively to Cyril Hoft (Perth).

Bandy
Sweden
 Championship final – IK Sirius 5–2 IFK Uppsala (replay following 2–2 draw)

Baseball
World Series
 5–13 October — New York Giants (NL) defeats New York Yankees (AL) to win the 1921 World Series by 5 games to 3
Major League Baseball
  Babe Ruth hits 59 home runs for the New York Yankees, establishing a new single-season record for the third consecutive year
Negro leagues
 The Chicago American Giants win their second consecutive Negro National League pennant

Boxing
Events
 2 July — boxing's first “million dollar gate” occurs when Jack Dempsey meets Georges Carpentier in a “hastily assembled outdoor arena built on a farm in Jersey City, New Jersey”.  A crowd of more than 80,000 attends an event billed by its promoter Tex Rickard as the "Battle of the Century". Dempsey wins by a fourth-round knockout in a scheduled 12-round fight which is also special for its radio broadcast.  It is the first-ever broadcast to a "mass audience" with ringside commentary relayed over the new radiophone to hundreds of thousands of people in the northeastern United States.
 Pete “Kid” Herman regains the World Bantamweight Championship but is beaten soon afterwards by new champion Johnny Buff.
Lineal world champions
 World Heavyweight Championship – Jack Dempsey
 World Light Heavyweight Championship – Georges Carpentier
 World Middleweight Championship – Johnny Wilson
 World Welterweight Championship – Jack Britton
 World Lightweight Championship – Benny Leonard
 World Featherweight Championship – Johnny Kilbane
 World Bantamweight Championship – Joe Lynch → Pete "Kid" Herman → Johnny Buff
 World Flyweight Championship – Jimmy Wilde

Canadian football
Grey Cup
  9th Grey Cup in the Canadian Football League – Toronto Argonauts 23–0 Edmonton Eskimos

Cricket
Events
 England tours Australia and becomes the first team to lose every match in a five-match Test series.  In the 1921 English season, Australia emphasises the post-war superiority that it owes, in particular, to the pace duo of Jack Gregory and Ted McDonald. Having won 5–0 in Australia the previous winter, the Australians win the first three Tests of the 1921 tour and then draw the last two.
England
 County Championship – Middlesex
 Minor Counties Championship – Staffordshire
 Most runs – Phil Mead 3179 @ 69.10 (HS 280*)
 Most wickets – Alec Kennedy 186 @ 21.55 (BB 8–11)
 Wisden Cricketers of the Year – Hubert Ashton, Jack Bryan, Jack Gregory, Charlie Macartney, Ted McDonald
Australia
 Sheffield Shield – New South Wales
 Most runs – Patsy Hendren 1178 @ 62.00 (HS 271)
 Most wickets – Arthur Mailey 81 @ 22.53 (BB 9–121)
India
 Bombay Quadrangular – Hindus and Parsees (shared)
New Zealand
 Plunket Shield – Wellington
South Africa
 Currie Cup – not contested
West Indies
 Inter-Colonial Tournament – unfinished

Cycling
Tour de France
 Léon Scieur (Belgium) wins the 15th Tour de France
Giro d'Italia
 Giovanni Brunero of Legnano wins the ninth Giro d'Italia

Figure skating
World Figure Skating Championships
 The championships are not held in 1921

Golf
Major tournaments
 Open Championship – Jock Hutchison
 US Open – Jim Barnes
 USPGA Championship – Walter Hagen
Other tournaments
 British Amateur – Willie Hunter
 US Amateur – Jesse Guilford

Horse racing
England
 Grand National – Shaun Spadah
 1,000 Guineas Stakes – Bettina
 2,000 Guineas Stakes – Craig an Eran
 The Derby – Humorist
 The Oaks – Love in Idleness
 St. Leger Stakes – Polemarch
Australia
 Melbourne Cup – Sister Olive
Canada
 King's Plate – Herendesy
France
 Prix de l'Arc de Triomphe – Ksar
Ireland
 Irish Grand National – Bohernore
 Irish Derby Stakes – Ballyheron
USA
 Kentucky Derby – Behave Yourself
 Preakness Stakes – Broomspun
 Belmont Stakes – Grey Lag

Ice hockey
Stanley Cup
 Ottawa Senators defeats Toronto St. Patricks to win the NHL championship.
 Vancouver Millionaires defeats Seattle Metropolitans in a two–game total–goal series 1–3, 6–0 (7–3) to win the PCHA championship.
 21 March – 4 April — Ottawa Senators defeats Vancouver Millionaires in the 1921 Stanley Cup Finals by 3 games to 2

Motorsport

Multi-sport events
Far Eastern Championship Games
 Fifth Far Eastern Championship Games held in Shanghai.

Women's World Games
 The 1921 Women's Olympiad begins in Monte Carlo, first international women's sports event

Rowing
The Boat Race
 30 March — Cambridge wins the 73rd Oxford and Cambridge Boat Race

Rugby league
England
 Championship – Hull
 Challenge Cup final – Leigh 13–0 Halifax at Wheater's Field, Broughton
 Lancashire League Championship – Wigan
 Yorkshire League Championship – Halifax
 Lancashire County Cup – Broughton Rangers 6–3 Leigh
 Yorkshire County Cup – Hull Kingston Rovers 2–0 Hull
Australia
 NSW Premiership – North Sydney (outright winner)

Rugby union
Five Nations Championship
 34th Five Nations Championship series is won by England who complete the Grand Slam

Shooting
Germany
National championship won by Mr. Janich firing an Ortgies semi-automatic pistol.

Speed skating
Speed Skating World Championships
 not contested

Tennis
Australia
 Australian Men's Singles Championship – Rhys Gemmell (Australia) defeats Alf Hedeman (Australia) 7–5 6–1 6–4
England
 Wimbledon Men's Singles Championship – Bill Tilden (USA) defeats Brian Norton (South Africa) 4–6 2–6 6–1 6–0 7–5
 Wimbledon Women's Singles Championship – Suzanne Lenglen (France) defeats Elizabeth Ryan (USA) 6–2, 6–0
France
 French Men's Singles Championship – Jean Samazeuilh (France) defeats André Gobert (France) 6–3 6–3 2–6 7–5
 French Women's Singles Championship – Suzanne Lenglen (France) defeats Germaine Golding (France) by a walkover
USA
 American Men's Singles Championship – Bill Tilden (USA) defeats Bill Johnston (USA) 6–1 1–6 7–5 5–7 6–3
 American Women's Singles Championship – Molla Bjurstedt Mallory (Norway) defeats Mary Browne (USA) 4–6 6–4 6–2
Davis Cup
 1921 International Lawn Tennis Challenge –  5–0  at West Side Tennis Club (grass) New York City, United States

Notes
Awarded retrospectively by the SANFL in 1998.
By Westar Rules in 1997.

References

 
Sports by year